This page provides the summaries of the CONCACAF First Round matches for 2014 FIFA World Cup qualification.

Format
In this round the ten lowest seeded teams were drawn into 5 home-and-away ties.

The matches were scheduled to be held prior to the main draw for the 2014 FIFA World Cup.  Originally, the first legs were scheduled for 3 June 2011 and the second legs on 7 June. However, the matches were postponed to scattered days in June and July, between 15 June and 17 July. The five winners advanced to the second round of the CONCACAF qualifiers.

Participating teams

Results

|}

Belize won 8–3 on aggregate and advanced to the Second Round.

Dominican Republic won 6–0 on aggregate and advances to the Second Round.

U.S. Virgin Islands won 4–1 on aggregate and advanced to the Second Round.

6–6 on aggregate. Saint Lucia won the penalty shoot-out 5–4 and advanced to the Second Round.

Bahamas won 10–0 on aggregate and advanced to the Second Round.

Goalscorers
There were a total of 44 goals scored over 10 games, for an average of 4.4 goals per game.

5 goals
 Lesly St. Fleur

4 goals
 Deon McCaulay

3 goals

 Jaylee Hodgson
 Jamil Joseph

2 goals

 Frederick Gomez
 Nesley Jean
 Jonathan Faña
 Inoel Navarro
 Reid Klopp

1 goal

 David Abdul
 Rensy Barradas
 Maurice Escalona
 Erik Santos de Gouveia
 Cameron Hepple
 Jackner Louis
 Daniel Jiménez
 Elroy Kuylen
 Luis Mendez
 Harrison Róches
 Trevor Peters
 Domingo Peralta
 Jhoan Sánchez
 Kevin Edward
 Kurt Frederick
 Cliff Valcin
 Alderman Lesmond
 Dwayne Thomas

1 own goal
 Woody Gibson (against Bahamas)

Notes

References

External links
Results and schedule (FIFA.com version)
Results and schedule (CONCACAF.com version)

1
2011–12 in Caribbean football
2011–12 in Belizean football